Granville Hall may refer to:

 Granville D. Hall (1837–1934), American journalist, businessman and politician
 G. Stanley Hall (1846–1924), American psychologist and educator
 USS Granville S. Hall (YAG-40), an American Liberty ship

See also
 Granville Town Hall, historic building in Sydney, Australia
 Granville Mall (disambiguation)
 Granville O. Haller